The Peninsula is an English language daily newspaper published from Doha, Qatar. Its main competitors are the Gulf Times and the Qatar Tribune.

History
The Peninsula was launched in 1996 by Dar Al Sharq. The company also publishes the Arabic news daily Al Sharq and recently launched (February 2016) Arabic business daily Lusail. The company is headed by chairman Thani bin Abdullah Al Thani, a member of the ruling family.

Format 
The Peninsula is published in all-colour broadsheet format and number of pages vary from 24 to 40. On weekdays they have 36 pages in the main section, which is divided into 24 pages on local and international news, 8 pages business news and 8 pages sports news. On weekends (Friday and Saturday) the newspaper is only 24 pages and single section.

It also have a 16-page community news tabloid called Doha Today published along with the newspaper from Sunday to Thursday. On Friday they have 16-page weekend tabloid named The Peninsula Plus. They also have a classified advertisement pullout called Penmag which is in tabloid format and published during the weekdays.

References

External links 
 

1996 establishments in Qatar
English-language newspapers published in Qatar
Mass media in Doha
Publications established in 1996